The Hafei Xiaobawang (小霸王) or Hafei Luzun-Xiaobawang (路尊小霸王) is a microvan by Hafei positioned above the slightly smaller Hafei Minyi.

Overview
The Hafei Xiaobawang (Small Conqueror) was launched in 2008 during the 2008 Beijing Auto Show. The Xiaobawang was built on the same platform and features the exact same powertrain as the Hafei Minyi microvan, and was launched as a more upmarket option to the Minyi microvan. In several markets, the Hafei Xiaobawang was also sold as the Hafei Minyi. There are two versions of the engine for the Xiaobawang, producing 48hp and 60 hp respectively. The more powerful 1.0 liter engine produces 60 hp (44kW)/5500rpm and 84Nm/3000-4000rpm. The only transmission is a 5-speed manual gearbox. The top speed of the Xiaobawang is 110 km/hr.

References

External links
Hafei Xiaobawang Specs
Jeep Grand Cherokee Features

2000s cars
Kei cars
Kei trucks
Rear-wheel-drive vehicles
Microvans
Cars of China
Cars introduced in 2008